23, original German title: 23 – Nichts ist so wie es scheint ("Nothing is what it seems") is a 1998 German drama thriller film about young hacker Karl Koch, who died on 23 May 1989, a presumed suicide. It was directed by Hans-Christian Schmid, who also participated in screenwriting. The title derives from the protagonist's obsession with the number 23, a phenomenon often described as apophenia. Although the film was well received by critics and audiences, its accuracy has been vocally disputed by some witnesses to the real-life events on which it was based. Schmid subsequently co-authored a book that tells the story of the making of 23 and also details the differences between the movie and the actual main events.

Plot
In 1980s Germany at the height of the Cold War, 19-year-old Karl Koch (August Diehl) finds the world around him threatening and chaotic. Inspired by the fictitious character Hagbard Celine (from Robert Anton Wilson and Robert Shea's 1975 book Illuminatus! Trilogy), he starts investigating the backgrounds of political and economic power and discovers signs that make him believe in a worldwide conspiracy.

At a meeting of the Chaos Computer Club, Karl gets to know the student David (Fabian Busch). David and Karl are able to hack into the global data network—which is still, at this point, in its early stages—and their belief in social justice propels them into espionage for the KGB. Driven by contacts with a drug dealer—and by increasing KGB pressure to hack successfully into foreign systems—Karl spirals into a cocaine dependency and grows increasingly alienated from David.

In a drug-addled state, Karl begins to sit in front of his computer for days at a time. Perpetually sleepless, he also grows increasingly delusional. When David publicly reveals the espionage activity in which the two men have been engaged, Karl is left alone to face the consequences. Collapse soon follows. Karl is taken to a hospital to deal with his drug addiction and mysteriously dies after his supposed hacking of Chernobyl .

Cast

 August Diehl as Karl Koch
 Fabian Busch as David
  as Pepe
  as Lupo
 Stephan Kampwirth as Jochen Maiwald
 Zbigniew Zamachowski as Sergej
 Peter Fitz as Brückner
 Burghart Klaußner as Weber
  as Beate
  as Alex
  as Seybert

See also
 23 Enigma
 The Number 23
 The Cuckoo's Egg, a book by Clifford Stoll – another account of the Hanover Hacker case, written by one of the system administrators who discovered the break-ins.
 List of films featuring surveillance

References

External links
 
 
 

1998 films
1990s biographical drama films
1990s thriller drama films
German thriller drama films
1990s German-language films
1990s English-language films
1990s Russian-language films
Films directed by Hans-Christian Schmid
Films about suicide
Films set in West Germany
Films set in East Germany
Films set in the 1980s
Films shot in Germany
Films shot in Cologne
German biographical drama films
Malware in fiction
Films about computer hacking
1998 multilingual films
German multilingual films
1999 films
Films about the KGB
1990s German films